Ships is the seventh full-length album by New Jersey indie rock band Danielson. The album was a massive collaboration among Daniel Smith and various other musicians.

Track listing
 "Ship the Majestic Suffix" – 2:54
 "Cast It at the Setting Sail" – 3:30
 "Bloodbook on the Halfshell" – 4:50
 "Did I Step on Your Trumpet" – 3:06
 "When It Comes to You I'm Lazy" – 3:53
 "Two Sitting Ducks" – 5:04
 "My Lion Sleeps Tonight" – 3:03
 "Kids Pushing Kids" – 6:17
 "Time That Bald Sexton" – 3:56
 "He Who Flattened Your Flame Is Gettin' Torched" – 2:51
 "Five Stars and Two Thumbs Up" – 2:46

Personnel
Steve Poponi, Dave Downham – recording (Gradwell)
Chris Cohen – electric guitar, vocals
Ben Swanson – recording, graphics
Luke Mosling – "ships" suffix contest winner (1172)
Lenny Smith – vocals, claps
Rachel Galloway – flute, vocals
Tom Eaton – trumpet
Jedidiah Slaboda – vocals, claps
Judy Miller – publicity (Motormouth)
Christiaan Palladino – keys, vocals, mixing assistance, recording
Satomi Matsuzaki – bass guitar
Megan Slaboda – glock, marimba, vocal
Brian McTear – mixing engineer (Miner Street)
Alan Douches – mastering (West Westside)
David Smith – drum kit
Lilly Smith – vocals, claps
Ted Velykis – orchestration, mixing assistant, bass guitar, bass clarinet
Josiah Wolf – drum kit
Ida Smith – vocals, claps
Andrew Smith – drums, percussion
Melissa Palladino – violin, vocal
Elin Smith – vocal, support
Chris Swanson – project manager
Erik Carter – live performance arrangements (Kork Agency)
Aaron DeVries – ships contest judge
Marian Smith – support
Amy Morrissey – mixing assistant (Miner Street)
Nicole Roeder – graphics
Emil Nikolaisen – mixing assistant
Paul Gold – lacquers (Brooklyn Phono)
Yoni Wolf – recording
Ken Fabianovicz – helper
Jon Galloway – recording
Sufjan Stevens – oboe, flutes, whistles, glock
John Ringhofer – trombone, vocal, recording
Greg Saunier – drum kit, vocal, recorder
John Dieterich – electric guitar, vocals
Daniel Smith – songs, vocal, acoustic guitar, production, artwork

References

2006 albums
Danielson albums
Secretly Canadian albums
Fire Records (UK) albums